A list of notable people who were at some point members of the defunct Nazi Party (NSDAP). It is not meant to be listing every person who was ever a member of the Nazi Party. This is a list of notable figures who were active within the party and whose course of action was somewhat of historical significance, or who were members of the Nazi Party according to multiple reliable sources. For a list of the main leaders and most important party figures see: List of Nazi Party leaders and officials.

Overview A–E F–K L–R S–Z

S

Ernst Sagebiel
Rudol von Stroheim
Ernst von Salomon
Ferdinand von Sammern-Frankenegg
Martin Sandberger
Eugen Sänger
Fritz Sauckel
Albert Sauer
Karl Saur
Charles Edward, Duke of Saxe-Coburg and Gotha
Princess Alexandra of Saxe-Coburg and Gotha
Georg, Prince of Saxe-Meiningen
Jacob Sbahi
Emanuel Schäfer
Georg Schäfer
Paul Schäfer
Georg Schaltenbrand
Hermann Schaper
Paul Scharfe
Willi Schatz
Julius Schaub
Wolrad, Prince of Schaumburg-Lippe
Gustav Adolf Scheel
Walter Scheel
Walter Schellenberg
Helmut Schelsky
Hans Schemm
Ernst Günther Schenck
Wilhelm Schepmann
Julian Scherner
Max Erwin von Scheubner-Richter
Gustav Schickedanz
Walter Schieber
Theodor Schieder
Karl Schiller 
Max von Schillings
Walter Schimana
Oskar Schindler
Baldur von Schirach
August Schirmer
Ernst Schlange
Franz Schlegelberger
Hans Schleif
Walter Schlesinger
Hanns-Martin Schleyer
Clemens Schmalstich
Ludwig Schmidseder
Heinrich Schmidt (physician)
Heinrich Schmidt (politician)
Paul Schmidt (interpreter)
Willy Schmidt-Gentner
Gustav Hermann Schmischke
Carl Schmitt
Kurt Schmitt
Philipp Schmitt
Paul Schmitthenner
Hermann Schmitz
Rudolf Schmundt
Carl Schneider
Christian Schneider
Hans Ernst Schneider
Georg von Schnitzler
Gertrud Scholtz-Klink
Fritz von Scholz
Karl Eberhard Schöngarth
Franz Schönhuber
Ferdinand Schörner
Vinzenz Schöttl
Percy Ernst Schramm
Julius Schreck
Wolfgang Schreyer
Hermann Schroeder
Gerhard Schröder (CDU)
Kurt Baron von Schröder
Friedrich Bernhard von der Schulenburg
Friedrich Werner von der Schulenburg
Fritz-Dietlof von der Schulenburg
Julius Schulte-Frohlinde
Norbert Schultze
Walther Schultze
Paul Schultze-Naumburg
Erwin Schulz
Libertas Schulze-Boysen
Richard Schulze-Kossens
Erich Schumann
Horst Schumann
Otto Schumann
Günther Schwab
Josef Schwammberger
Franz Xaver Schwarz
Heinrich Schwarz
Gustav Schwarzenegger
Elisabeth Schwarzkopf
Franz Schwede
Hans Schweitzer
Otto Scrinzi
Herbert Scurla
Rudolf Joachim Seck
Hans Sedlmayr
Siegfried Seidl
Max Seiffert
Franz Seldte
Herbert Selpin
Rudolf Sellner
Emil Sembach
Alexander von Senger
Hermann Senkowsky
Hans Joachim Sewering
Arthur Seyß-Inquart
Friedrich Siebert
Ludwig Siebert
Wolfram Sievers
Gustav Simon
Max Simon
Franz Six
Wilhelm Simon
Otto Skorzeny
Wolfram von Soden
Gerhard Sommer
Hans Sommer
Martin Sommer
Franz von Sonnleithner
Duchess Sophia Charlotte of Oldenburg
Gustav Sorge
Richard Sorge
Josef Spacil
Othmar Spann
Hugo Spatz
Albert Speer
Jakob Sporrenberg
Jakob Sprenger
Heinrich Freiherr von Stackelberg
Sylvester Stadler
Franz Walter Stahlecker
Franz Stangl
Hans Stark
Johannes Stark
Ludwig Steeg
Gustav Adolf Steengracht von Moyland
Eugen Steimle
Otto Steinbrinck
Felix Steiner
Otto Steinert
Otto Steinhäusl
Theophil Stengel
Ernst Stengelin
Walther Stennes
Ilse Stöbe
Edmund Stoeckle
Franz Stofel
Franz Stöhr
Willi Stöhr
Hugo Stoltzenberg
Gregor Strasser
Otto Strasser
Karl Straube
Eduard Strauch
Bruno Streckenbach
Heinrich Strecker
Julius Streicher
Karl Hans Strobl
Heinrich Karl Strohm
Karl Strölin
Jürgen Stroop
Wilhelm Stuckart
Richard Stücklen
Ludwig Stumpfegger
Emil Stürtz
Franz Suchomel
Karl Sudhoff
Fritz Suhren
Wilhelm Süss
Josef Swientek
Fritz Szepan

T

Günther Tamaschke
Eberhard Taubert
Oswald Teichmüller
Otto Telschow
Ernst Tengelmann
Josef Terboven
Bruno Tesch
Wilhelm Teudt
Adolf von Thadden
Otto Georg Thierack
Heinz Thilo
Richard Thomalla
Anton Thumann
Bruno Thüring
Fritz Thyssen
Erich Timm
Lotte Toberentz
Fritz Todt
Karl Toman
Eduard Paul Tratz
Erich Traub
Gerdy Troost
Alfred Trzebinski
Hans von Tschammer und Osten
Harald Turner

U

Ernst Udet
Friedrich Uebelhoer
Friedrich Ulbrand
Bodo Uhse
Paul Uhlenhuth
Siegfried Uiberreither

V

Theodor Vahlen
Edmund Veesenmayer
Willi Veller
Otmar Freiherr von Verschuer
Will Vesper
Helmut Vetter
Werner Villinger
Carl de Vogt
Hans Vogt (composer)
Heinrich Vogt (astronomer)
Joseph Vogt
Elisabeth Volkenrath
Hermann Voss

W

Otto Wächter
Fritz Wächtler
Hilmar Wäckerle
Otto Wagener
Adolf Wagner
Gerhard Wagner (physician)
Gustav Wagner
Josef Wagner (Gauleiter)
Robert Heinrich Wagner
Winifred Wagner
Bruno Wahl
Karl Wahl
Ernst Wahle
Josias, Hereditary Prince of Waldeck and Pyrmont
Kurt Waldheim
Ernst Waldschmidt
Erna Wallisch
Martin Walser
Hertha Wambacher
Otto-Wilhelm Wandesleben
Felix Wankel
Erich Wasicky
Christian Weber (SS general)
Friedrich Weber
Otto Weber (theologian)
Friedrich Wegener
Paul Wegener
Bernhard Wehner
Josef Magnus Wehner
Alfred Weidenmann
Josef Weinheber
Karl Weinrich
Jakob Weiseborn
Martin Gottfried Weiss
Wilhelm Weiß
Eduard Weiter
Fritz Weitzel
Ernst von Weizsäcker
Richard Wendler
Jakob Werlin
Joachim Werner (archaeologist)
Horst Wessel
Paula Wessely
Richard Wetz
Albert Widmann
Fritz Wiedemann
Helmut Wielandt
Arpad Wigand
Karl Maria Wiligut
Werner Willikens
Herbert Windt
Hans Winkler
Heinz Winkler
Johannes Winkler
Max Winkler
Giselher Wirsing
Christian Wirth
Herman Wirth
Eduard Wirths
Dieter Wisliceny
Fritz Witt
Georg Wittig
Michael Wittmann
Johanna Wolf
Karl Wolff
Kurt Wöss
Udo von Woyrsch
Gustav Adolf von Wulffen
Alfred Wunderlich
Alfred Wünnenberg
Joachim Wünning
Bartłomiej Wołynkiewicz
Carl Wurster
Philipp Wurzbacher
Walther Wüst

Y

Wolfgang Yorck von Wartenburg

Z

Wilhelm Zander
Wilhelm Zangen
August Zehender
Carltheo Zeitschel
Hans Heinz Zerlett
Adolf Ziegler
Hans Severus Ziegler
Joachim Ziegler
Franz Ziereis
Ernst Zierke
Hermann Zilcher
Egon Zill
Emma Zimmer
Ferdinand Zimmermann
Friedrich Zimmermann
Hans Zimmermann
Mario Zippermayr
Anton Zischka
Wilhelm Zoepf
Adolf Zutter
Fritz Zweigelt

References

Bibliography

External links
A-Z category of Nazi Party members on German Wikipedia

 
Nazis